Lord Herdmanston was a title in the Peerage of Scotland that was held by the Sinclair or St Clair family.

History

Herdmanston in East Lothian had been held  from the 12th century, when Henry St Clair received a grant of the lands of Herdmanston, from Richard de Morville, Constable of Scotland. It is not known if the Sinclair Lords Herdmanston share a common origin with the Sinclair Barons of Roslin, from whom branch off the Lords Sinclair and Earls of Caithness. According to the website sinclairgenealogy.info, the fact that the first proven Baron of Roslin, William St. Clair (died 1297) was made sheriff of Haddington in East Lothian where Herdmanston also is, suggests that he was appointed there to cover his own home area, and given that the name William appears frequently in the St Clair of Herdmanston family suggests that he may have been part of their extended family. However, according to the website clansinclairusa.org, William St Clair of Roslin was probably unrelated to the St Clairs of Herdmanston. According to Archibald Allan writing in 1900, Henry St Clair of Herdmanston appears to have been a son of the first William de St Clair of Roslin of the 11th century, but this William's existence cannot be proved by contemporary evidence and according to Roland Saint-Clair, William St. Clair who died in 1297 was the first proven Baron of Roslin.

The Sinclairs of Herdmanston are recorded by James Balfour Paul in his The Scots Peerage. They are also recorded by Bernard Burke in his a Genealogical and Heraldic Dictionary of the Peerage and Baronetage of the British Empire, and by 18th century herald, Alexander Nisbet, in his A System of Heraldry. The coat of arms of the  Sinclair of Herdmanston family is similar to that of the Lord Sinclair, but the tincture of the cross was changed from azure to sable.

Lords Herdmanston

Roland Saint-Clair writing in the late 19th century lists the following Lords Herdmanston:

Henry Sinclair, 1st Lord Herdmanston
Alan de Sinclair, 2nd Lord Herdmanston (fl. c. 1244)
John Sinclair, 3rd Lord Herdmanston (fl. c. 1248)
John de Sinclair, 4th Lord Herdmanston (fl. c. 1296)
William Sinclair, 5th Lord Herdmanston (fl. c. 1325)
William Sinclair, 6th Lord Herdmanston  (fl. c. 1364)
John Sinclair, 7th Lord Herdmanston (fl. c. 1381)
William Sinclair, 8th Lord Herdmanston (fl. c. 1407)
John Sinclair, 11th Lord Herdmanston (fl. c. 1434)
John Sinclair, fiar of Herdmanston (fl. c. 1472)
William Sinclair, 12th Lord Herdmanston (fl. c. 1451)
John Sinclair, 13th Lord Herdmanston (fl. c. 1481)
William Sinclair, 14th Lord Herdmanston (fl. c. 1513)
John de Sinclair, 15th Lord Herdmanston (fl. c. 1545)
William Sinclair, 16th Lord Herdmanston (fl. c. 1586)
John Sinclair, 17th Lord Herdmanston
Henry Sinclair, 18th Lord Herdmanston
William Sinclair, 19th Lord Herdmanston
John Sinclair, 20th Lord Herdmanston
John Sinclair, 21st Lord Herdmanston, married Mary Richardson, daughter of Sir James Richardson of Smeaton
John Sinclair, 22nd Lord Herdmanston (d. 1686), married Elizabeth Sinclair, second daughter of John Sinclair of Stevenston
John Sinclair, 23rd Lord Herdmanston (1632–1666), married Catherine Sinclair, daughter and heir of John Sinclair, 10th Lord Sinclair
Henry Sinclair, 24th Lord Herdmanston and 11th Lord Sinclair
John Sinclair, 25th Lord Herdmanston (1683–1750)
James Sinclair, 26th Lord Herdmanston (1688–1762)
Charles Sinclair, 27th Lord Herdmanston (–1775), de jure 11th Lord Sinclair
Andrew Sinclair, 28th Lord Herdmanston (1733–1776), de jure 12th Lord Sinclair
Charles Sinclair, 29th Lord Herdmanston (1768–1863) (fl. c. 1782)

References

Herdmanston
 
Herdmanston